MY QI-Meritus.Mahara is a Malaysian motor racing team, primarily competing in the GP2 Asia Series. The team is owned by Peter Thompson and Firhat Mokhzani, and managed by engineer Sean Thompson. The team was founded as Marlboro Castrol Meritus in 1996.

F4 SEA is a one-team arrive and drive championship, run by MERITUS.GP. A premium race engineering services provider, MERITUS.GP have 36 Championship titles competing in GP2, Lamborghini Super Trofeo, Formula Renault V6, Formula Masters and Formula BMW. 
MERITUS.GP drivers like Earl Bamber, Luca Fillipi, Alex Yoong, Afiq Ikhwan, Narain Karthikeyan, Alexander Rossi, Takuma Sato, Jazeman Jaafar & Rio Haryanto have gone on to Formula 1, Le Mans and Indy Car.

Results

GP2 Asia Series 
(key) (Races in bold indicate pole position) (Races in italics indicate fastest lap)

Timeline

References

External links

Malaysian auto racing teams
GP2 Series teams
Formula BMW teams
British Formula Three teams
Auto racing teams established in 1983
1983 establishments in the United Kingdom